is a passenger railway station  located in the city of Kawanishi, Hyōgo Prefecture, Japan. It is operated by the private transportation company Nose Electric Railway.

Lines

Station layout
The station consists of two opposed unnumbered side platforms, connected by a level crossing. All ticket gates are located on the north side of the platform for Hirano. The platform had been extended to accommodate six-car trains, but due to barrier-free construction in 2010, the effective length of the Yamashita-bound platform was shortened to five cars.

Platforms

Adjacent stations

History
Tada Station opened on April 13, 1913. It was relocated to its current location on June 8, 1952.

Passenger statistics
In fiscal 2019, the station was used by an average of 7,271 passengers daily

Surrounding area
Tada Shrine
Toyo Tire & Rubber Research and Development Center

See also
List of railway stations in Japan

References

External links 

 Tada Station official home page 

Railway stations in Hyōgo Prefecture
Stations of Nose Electric Railway
Railway stations in Japan opened in 1913
Kawanishi, Hyōgo